mesg is a Unix command that sets or reports the permission other users have to write to the current user's terminal using the talk and write commands.

Usage
It is invoked as:

mesg [y|n]

The 'y' and 'n' options respectively allow and disallow write access to the current user's terminal. When invoked with no option, the current permission is printed.

Input redirection may be used to control the permission of another TTY.  For example:

% mesg
is y
% tty
/dev/tty1
% mesg < /dev/tty2
is y
% mesg n < /dev/tty2
% mesg < /dev/tty2
is n
% mesg
is y

See also

List of Unix commands

References

Unix user management and support-related utilities
Unix SUS2008 utilities